Hydroxyquinone often refers to a hydroxybenzoquinone, any organic compound with formula  which can be viewed as a derivative of a benzoquinone through replacement of one hydrogen atom (H) by a hydroxyl group (-OH). When unqualified, the terms usually mean specifically the compound 2-hydroxy-1,4-benzoquinone, derived from 1,4-benzoquinone or para-benzoquinone (which often called just "quinone").

More generally, the term may refer to any derivative of any quinone (such as 1,2-benzoquinone, 1,4-naphthoquinone or 9,10-anthraquinone), where any number n of hydrogens have been replaced by n hydroxyls.  In this case the number n is indicated by a multiplier prefix (mono-, di-, tri-, etc.), and the parent quinone's name is used instead of just "quinone" — as in tetrahydroxy-1,4-benzoquinone.

The hydroxyquinones (in the particular or the general sense) include many biologically and industrially important compounds, and are a building block of many medicinal drugs.

Hydroxyquinones with hydroxyls adjacent to the ketone groups often exhibit intramolecular hydrogen bonding, which  affects their redox properties and their biochemical properties.

The term "hydroxyquinone" should not be confused with hydroquinone, the common name of benzene-1,4-diol.

Subfamilies
Hydroxybenzoquinones
Hydroxynaphthoquinones
Hydroxyanthraquinones

References

Hydroxyquinones